Ernst von Salomon (25 September 1902 – 9 August 1972) was a German novelist and screenwriter. He was a Weimar-era national-revolutionary activist and right-wing Freikorps member.

Family and education 
He was born in Kiel, in the Prussian province of Schleswig-Holstein, the son of a criminal investigation officer. Salomon attended the Musterschule gymnasium in Frankfurt.

Military service 
From 1913 Salomon was raised as a cadet in Karlsruhe and in Lichterfelde near Berlin; during the German Revolution of 1918–19, he joined the paramilitary Freikorps ("Free-Corps") unit under Georg Ludwig Rudolf Maercker suppressing the Spartacist Uprising. Later in 1919, he fought in the Baltic against the Bolsheviks and the Estonian and Latvian armies. With his unit he took part in the Kapp-Putsch in March 1920. He also fought against Polish insurgents in what the Poles call the Silesian Uprisings of 1921.

Political activity before and during WW2 
After the Freikorps units had been officially dissolved in 1920, Salomon joined the Organisation Consul and received a five-year prison sentence in 1922 for his part in the assassination of Foreign Minister Walther Rathenau – he provided a car for the assassins. In 1927, he received another prison sentence for an attempted Feme murder (paramilitary "self-justice"), and was pardoned by Reich President Paul von Hindenburg after a few months – he had not killed the severely wounded victim, Wagner, when he pleaded for his life, which was noted by the court.

After his release from prison, Salomon committed himself to the support of Feme murder convicts and began to publish feuilleton articles in the national conservative Deutsche Allgemeine Zeitung newspaper, which earned him the attention of Conservative Revolutionary and National Bolshevist circles around Friedrich Hielscher and Arnolt Bronnen.

In 1929, he backed his elder brother Bruno in his struggle for the Schleswig-Holstein Rural People's Movement by simulating a bomb attack on the Reichstag building in Berlin. He had to spend three months in investigative custody, during which time he finished writing his first novel The Outlaws (Die Geächteten), published by Ernst Rowohlt.

Unlike many other German writers and poets, he did not sign the Gelöbnis treuester Gefolgschaft proclamation of loyalty to Adolf Hitler. He had been arrested after the Nazi Machtergreifung, together with Hans Fallada, but was released after a few days. Suspiciously eyed by the authorities, who suspected him to be an adherent of Otto Strasser's "Third Position", he earned his living by writing film scripts for the German film company UFA. Salomon wrote the screenplay for the 1941 anti-British propaganda film Carl Peters.

He supported Ernst Rowohlt after he had received a publishing ban for employing Jewish personnel and temporarily corresponded with conservative resistance circles around Arvid Harnack and Harro Schulze-Boysen. His lover, Ille Gotthelft, was Jewish but he was able to protect her from persecution by passing her off as his spouse. In his autobiographical The Answers he described how both were arrested and seriously mistreated in 1945 by American soldiers when they were arrested, and called "Nazi swine!" and "despicable creatures". Salomon was interned by the American Military Authorities until September 1946.

In 1951 he published the book The Questionnaire (Der Fragebogen), in which he gave his ironic and sarcastic "Answers" to the 131 point questionnaire concerning people's activities between 1933-1945 which the Western Allied Military Governments in Germany issued by the tens of thousands at the end of the war. A famous public discussion of the book took place in the main train station of Cologne, organised by bookseller Gerhard Ludwig. Although Liberals and the Left condemned it violently, the book was a sensation in Germany and between its publication in 1951 and 1954 by which time it had sold over 250,000 copies.

Death
Ernst von Salomon died of heart failure at his home near Hamburg on 9 August 1972. He was 69 years of age.

Selected filmography
 Men Without a Fatherland (1937)
 Carl Peters (1941)
 The Endless Road (1943)

Bibliography
(Note: this bibliography is incomplete.)
 Die Geächteten (translated as The Outlaws) (1930), a fictionalized account of Ernst von Salomon's adventures as a Freikorps fighter.
 Die Stadt ("The City" – translated as It Cannot Be Stormed) (1932)
 Die Kadetten ("The Cadets") (1933)
 Putsch ("Coup d'État") (1933) 
 Der Fragebogen (The Questionnaire or Answers to the 131 Questions of the Allied Military Government.) (Germany 1951). English edition, by Putnam, London, 1954.
 Die schöne Wilhelmine ("The Beautiful Wilhelmine") (1965)
 Der tote Preuße ("The Dead Prussian") (1973)

References

1902 births
1972 deaths
Writers from Kiel
People from the Province of Schleswig-Holstein
German male screenwriters
German Peace Union politicians
Organisation Consul members
20th-century Freikorps personnel
Conservative Revolutionary movement
German male writers
People educated at the Musterschule
20th-century German screenwriters
20th-century German criminals